Enriqueta Duarte (born February 26, 1929) is an Argentine freestyle swimmer who competed at the 1948 Summer Olympics.  She was the first Argentine female to swim the English Channel on 16 August 1951.

References

1929 births
Living people
Swimmers at the 1948 Summer Olympics
Olympic swimmers of Argentina
Argentine female freestyle swimmers
Argentine female long-distance swimmers
English Channel swimmers
Swimmers from Buenos Aires
20th-century Argentine women